This is a list of notable events in country music that took place in 1967.

Events
April 1 — The Country Music Hall of Fame and Museum opens in Nashville.
September — Lynn Anderson becomes a featured vocalist on The Lawrence Welk Show; earlier in the year, she signs her first national recording contract with Chart Records.
September 30 – Singer-songwriter Leon Ashley becomes the first performer in the genre to write, record, produce, release, distribute and publish a single that reaches No. 1 on the Billboard Hot Country Singles chart with "Laura (What's He Got That I Ain't Got)."
October — The first Country Music Association Awards are handed out at Nashville's Municipal Auditorium. The show is not televised.

No dates
For the first time in history, more than 20 No. 1 songs top the Billboard Hot Country Singles chart in a 52-week timespan. It will mark the start of a new trend in country music: a proliferation of No. 1 songs in a given year, a trend that – thanks to changes in radio programming Billboard data compilation – peaks in 1986 when there is a new No. 1 song every week.
Dolly Parton joins Porter Wagoner's band, television series and road show. She and Wagoner record their first duets, releasing "The Last Thing on My Mind" (their first major hit together) late in the year. Parton will go on to become the first woman in country music to have top 10 hits in five different decades.
The Browns disband when sisters Maxine and Bonnie leave the group. Jim Ed Brown begins the second phase of his long career – as a solo recording artist. The move pays off, as he immediately scores with "Pop a Top."

Top hits of the year

Number one hits

United States
(as certified by Billboard)

Notes
1^ No. 1 song of the year, as determined by Billboard.
2^ Song dropped from No. 1 and later returned to top spot.
A^ First Billboard No. 1 hit for that artist.
B^ Last Billboard No. 1 hit for that artist.
C^ Only Billboard No. 1 hit for that artist to date.

Canada
(as certified by RPM)

Notes
2^ Song dropped from No. 1 and later returned to top spot.
A^ First RPM No. 1 hit for that artist.
C^ Only RPM No. 1 hit for that artist.

Other major hits

Singles released by American artists

Singles released by Canadian artists

Top new album releases

Other top albums

Births
 February 6 — Anita Cochran, vocalist best known for 1998 hit "What If I Said"
 April 5 — Troy Gentry, one half of Montgomery Gentry (d. 2017)
 May 1 — Tim McGraw, singer and actor active since the 1990s, also known for marriage to Faith Hill.
 September 21 — Faith Hill, singer known for her multi-genre success since the 1990s, and marriage to Tim McGraw.
 October 26 — Keith Urban, Australian-born singer who began enjoying great success in the United States since 2000.
 December 5 — Gary Allan, Bakersfield-styled singer-songwriter since the 1990s.

Deaths
January 1 — Moon Mullican, 57, known as the "King of the Hillbilly Piano Players", also widely known today for his hit "I'll Sail My Ship Alone" (heart attack).

Country Music Hall of Fame Inductees
Red Foley (1910–1968)
J. L. Frank (1900–1952)
Jim Reeves (1923–1964)
Stephen H. Sholes (1911–1968)

Major awards

Grammy Awards
Best Country and Western Solo Vocal Performance, Female — "I Don't Wanna Play House", Tammy Wynette
Best Country and Western Solo Vocal Performance, Male — "Gentle on My Mind", Glen Campbell
Best Country and Western Performance, Duet, Trio or Group (Vocal or Instrumental) — "Jackson," Johnny Cash and June Carter
Best Country and Western Recording — "Gentle on My Mind", Al De Lory (Performer: Glen Campbell)
Best Country and Western Song — "Gentle on My Mind", John Hartford (Performer: Glen Campbell)

Academy of Country Music
Album of the Year — Gentle on My Mind, Glen Campbell
Top Male Vocalist — Glen Campbell
Top Female Vocalist — Lynn Anderson
Top Vocal Duo — Merle Haggard and Bonnie Owens
Top Vocal Group — Sons of the Pioneers
Top New Male Vocalist — Jerry Inman
Top New Female Vocalist — Bobbie Gentry

Country Music Association
Founding President's Award (formerly Connie B. Gay Award) — Gene Nash, Leroy Van Dyke 
Entertainer of the Year — Eddy Arnold
Song of the Year — "There Goes My Everything", Dallas Frazier (Performer: Jack Greene)
Single of the Year — "There Goes My Everything", Jack Greene
Album of the Year — There Goes My Everything, Jack Greene
Male Vocalist of the Year — Jack Greene
Female Vocalist of the Year — Loretta Lynn
Vocal Group of the Year — The Stoneman Family
Instrumentalist of the Year — Chet Atkins
Instrumental Group of the Year — The Buckaroos
Comedian of the Year — Don Bowman

See also
Country Music Association
Inductees of the Country Music Hall of Fame

Further reading
Kingsbury, Paul, "The Grand Ole Opry: History of Country Music. 70 Years of the Songs, the Stars and the Stories," Villard Books, Random House; Opryland USA, 1995
Kingsbury, Paul, "Vinyl Hayride: Country Music Album Covers 1947–1989," Country Music Foundation, 2003
Millard, Bob, "Country Music: 70 Years of America's Favorite Music," HarperCollins, New York, 1993
Whitburn, Joel, "Top Country Songs 1944–2005 – 6th Edition." 2005.

External links
Country Music Hall of Fame

Country
Country music by year